Miroslav Šandor (born 16 June 1958) is a Czechoslovak boxer. He competed in the men's featherweight event at the 1980 Summer Olympics.

References

1958 births
Living people
Czech male boxers
Czechoslovak male boxers
Olympic boxers of Czechoslovakia
Boxers at the 1980 Summer Olympics
Sportspeople from Olomouc
Featherweight boxers